Whimsical may refer to:
 Whimsical (horse) (born 1903), 1906 winner of the Preakness Stakes
 "Whimsical," a song by Days of the New from their 1997 album Days of the New (also known as the "Orange album")
 Whimsical Stakes, a Canadian Thoroughbred horse race run annually in mid April at Woodbine Racetrack in Toronto, Ontario
 Whimsical Will, the Demented News broadcaster on the Dr. Demento radio show
 Whimsical World Collection, Taiwanese Mandopop artiste Rainie Yang's first collection album